Qalanjeh (also Romanized as Qalānjeh; also known as Kalānchāh and Qalāncheh) is a village in Badr Rural District, in the Central District of Ravansar County, Kermanshah Province, Iran. At the 2006 census, its population was 30, in 7 families.

References 

Populated places in Ravansar County